The Nauvoo Bell is a bell tower in Salt Lake City's Temple Square, in the U.S. state of Utah.

The tower displays multiple sculptures, including 1942 works by Avard Fairbanks. Benevolence depicts women and children and measures approximately 4 feet tall by 3 feet wide. Pioneering has the same dimensions and depicts a family with one man, one women, and two children. Both works, collectively known as the Bell Tower Plaques, were surveyed by the Smithsonian Institution's Save Outdoor Sculpture!" program in 1993.

References

External links

 

Bell towers in the United States
Buildings and structures in Salt Lake City
Individual bells in the United States
Temple Square